This was the first time a WTA level was held in İstanbul.Top seed Venus Williams won the title, defeating Nicole Vaidišová in the final, 6–3, 6–2.

Seeds
The top two seeds received a bye into the second round.

Draw

Finals

Top half

Bottom half

External links
 WTA tournament draws
 ITF tournament edition details

Istanbul Cup - Singles
İstanbul Cup